Lady finger, ladyfinger, or lady's finger may refer to:

Food 
 Ladyfinger (biscuit), light and sweet sponge cakes roughly shaped like a large finger
 Lady Finger (cocktail), a drink comprising cherry brandy, gin and kirsch

Botany 
 Okra, a pod vegetable plant also known as lady's fingers
 Ladyfinger cactus, a common name for the cacti Mammillaria elongata or Echinocereus pentalophus
 Lady Finger banana, a variety of banana also known as Sucrier, Sugar banana, or Date banana

Other uses 
 "Ladyfingers" (song), a 1999 song by Luscious Jackson
 Ladyfingers, a song from the 1965 album Whipped Cream & Other Delights by Herb Alpert & the Tijuana Brass
 Ladyfinger Peak, another name for Bublimotin, a granite spire above the Hunza valley in northern Pakistan
 Small firecrackers, often arranged in bunches which explode in rapid succession 
 Ladyfingers, original title of the 1921 film Alias Ladyfingers